Santana da Ponte Pensa is a municipality in the state of São Paulo in Brazil. The population is 1,467 (2020 est.) in an area of 130 km². The elevation is 426 m.

References

Municipalities in São Paulo (state)